Abdullah Muhammad Issa Al-Nauri Al-Ali (Arabic: عبد الله محمد عيسى الناوري العلي) was an Emirati novelist and police officer. He is the first to write the police novel in the Emirates, with his only novel “A Neck Looking for a Contract” (Original title: eanuq yabhath ean eaqda) which was published in 1978.

Biography 
Abdullah Muhammad Issa Al-Nauri Al-Ali was born and raised in the Emirate of Ras Al Khaimah in 1959 AD. He joined the police force in 1975, and after gaining enough experience in police work he then shifted his interest to crime literature. Al-Nauri passed away on April 18, 2021/Ramadan 7, 1442 at the age of 62 due to chronic heart condition and the writers mourned him.

Literary career 
"He was passionate about reading police novels since he was a kid and especially Agatha Christie's novels which motivated him to direct his talent towards this specific type of literature". He published in 1978 his novel “A Neck Looking for a Contract” and he was considered the first to publish police novels in the United Arab Emirates.

He then got interested in writing short stories and publishing them in magazines and newspapers but wasn't published all in one book. He also was interested in poetry in his late days.

"After he wrote the first police novel entitled “A Neck Looking for a Contract” which he used his experience from working with the police in writing it. There is a lot in his journey that can be adhered to in order to present it to the new reader who may not know a lot about him as he is one of the pioneering and founding generation writers who struggled in making a name for themselves, yet succeeded in -the 70's- in establishing a new taste and a new reader without forgetting that the first generation was armed with a large number of Arab and international heritage writers. He wrote his creations within an intellectual, social and humanitarian system led by the keenness to record the events that the country is going through within a realistic novel to achieve the concept of commitment within its people".

Al-Nauri comes in the second place in the United Arab Emirates in terms of novel publishing after Shahinda and in the first place in Ras Al-Khaimah and his novel “A Neck Looking for a Contract” is the first police novel in the country, and on the cover, of the first edition:

“The writer of this story is a young man in his prime, 19 years old, born in Ras Al Khaimah. Holds an average qualification. He joined the service as a civil clerk at the Police and Public Security Directorate in Ras Al Khaimah, Investigations Department. He received military training, after which he joined the military. He now works as a policeman in the same department. He pays special attention to the study of issues characterized by ambiguity. “A Neck Looking for a Contract” is his first writing, and he now has writings in print that will be published soon.

Works 
 "A Neck Looking for a Contract", 1978 and reprinted in 2009

References 

1959 births
2021 deaths
Crime fiction writers
Emirati police officers
Emirati novelists
People from the Emirate of Ras Al Khaimah